Eyo Esang Obisung is an Oron Town in Oron local government area of Akwa Ibom state in Nigeria.

References 

Places in Oron Nation
Villages in Akwa Ibom